Richard Shoup may refer to:
 Richard G. Shoup (1923–1995), U.S. Representative from Montana
 Richard Shoup (programmer) (1943–2015), computer programmer who developed SuperPaint

See also
Shoup (disambiguation)